Barilepton is a genus of flower weevils in the beetle family Curculionidae. There are about 13 described species in Barilepton.

Species
These 13 species belong to the genus Barilepton:

 Barilepton albescens LeConte & J.L., 1880
 Barilepton bivittatus LeConte & J.L
 Barilepton cribricollis LeConte & J.L., 1876
 Barilepton falciger Casey, 1892
 Barilepton famelicum Casey, 1892
 Barilepton filiforme LeConte, 1876
 Barilepton grandicollis LeConte & J.L., 1876
 Barilepton linearis LeConte & J.L., 1876
 Barilepton lutescens LeConte & J.L., 1880
 Barilepton productum Casey, 1920
 Barilepton quadricolle LeConte, 1876
 Barilepton robusta Blatchley, 1920
 Barilepton robustus Fall & H.C.

References

Further reading

 
 
 

Baridinae
Articles created by Qbugbot